Way Down is an album by saxophonist Curtis Amy recorded in early 1962 for the Pacific Jazz label.

Reception

AllMusic reviewer David Szatmary described the album as containing "excellent West Coast bop".

Track listing
All compositions by Curtis Amy, except where indicated
 "Way Down" (Onzy Matthews) - 7:37
 "Liberia" - 6:44
 "24 Hour Blues" - 5:20
 "Liza" - 2:32
 "A Soulful Bee, A Soulful Rose" - 6:52
 "All My Life" (Sam H. Stept, Sidney D. Mitchell) - 7:17
 "Bells and Horns" (Milt Jackson) - 5:34

Personnel 
Curtis Amy - tenor saxophone
Marcus Belgrave - trumpet
Roy Brewster - valve trombone
Roy Ayers - vibraphone
John Houston (tracks 3-5), Victor Feldman (tracks 1, 2, 6 & 7) - piano
George Morrow - bass
Tony Bazley - drums

References 

1962 albums
Pacific Jazz Records albums
Curtis Amy albums